Ogres Ziņas is a regional newspaper published in Latvia. It also is web-hosted in English.

References

Mass media in Ogre, Latvia
Newspapers published in Latvia